The 1978-79 FIRA Trophy was the 19th edition of a European rugby union championship for national teams.

The tournament was won by France, with a Grand Slam. Romania reached the 2nd place, achieving an historical 44–0 win over Italy at 22 April 1979, in Bucharest.

First division 
Table

Spain relegated to division 2

Results

Second Division

Pool 1 
Table

Results

Pool 2 
Table

Results

Finals 

Morocco promoted to division 1

Bibliography 
 Francesco Volpe, Valerio Vecchiarelli (2000), 2000 Italia in Meta, Storia della nazionale italiana di rugby dagli albori al Sei Nazioni, GS Editore (2000) .
 Francesco Volpe, Paolo Pacitti (Author), Rugby 2000, GTE Gruppo Editorale (1999).

References

External links
 FIRA-AER official website

1978–79 in European rugby union
1978–79
1979 rugby union tournaments for national teams
1978 rugby union tournaments for national teams